Himantostylus is a genus of horse flies in the family Tabanidae.

Distribution
Panama to Bolivia.

Species
Himantostylus intermedius Lutz, 1913

References

Tabanidae
Brachycera genera
Diptera of South America
Diptera of North America
Taxa named by Adolfo Lutz